Kheyrabad is a village in Baharak District, Badakhshan Province in north-eastern Afghanistan.

References 

Populated places in Baharak District